Paw Paw Township is one of seven townships in Wabash County, Indiana, United States. As of the 2010 census, its population was 1,691 and it contained 683 housing units.

History
The Halderman-Van Buskirk Farmstead, Roann Covered Bridge, Roann Historic District, and Stockdale Mill are listed on the National Register of Historic Places.

Geography

Cities, towns, villages
 Roann

Unincorporated towns
 Urbana at 
(This list is based on USGS data and may include former settlements.)

Adjacent townships
 Pleasant Township (north)
 Chester Township (northeast)
 Lagro Township (southeast)
 Noble Township (south)
 Perry Township, Miami County (west)
 Richland Township, Miami County (west)

Cemeteries
The township contains these seven cemeteries: Abshire, Algers, Gamble, Independent Order of Odd Fellows, Jack, Long and Reeds.

Education
 Metropolitan School District of Wabash County Schools

Paw Paw Township is served by the Roann-Paw Paw Township Public Library.

Political districts
 Indiana's 5th congressional district
 State House District 22
 State Senate District 18

References
 United States Census Bureau 2007 TIGER/Line Shapefiles
 United States Board on Geographic Names (GNIS)
 IndianaMap

External links
 Indiana Township Association
 United Township Association of Indiana

Townships in Wabash County, Indiana
Townships in Indiana